Ricardo Cortés Lastra, is a Spanish politician. He served as a Member of the European Parliament, representing Spain for the Spanish Socialist Workers Party from 2009 to 2014.

Parliamentary service
He served as Chair of the Delegation to the EU-Mexico Joint Parliamentary Committee from 2010 to 2014. He served as Vice-Chair of the Delegation to the Euro-Latin American Parliamentary Assembly from 2009 to 2010.

References

1969 births
Living people
Members of the 12th Congress of Deputies (Spain)
MEPs for Spain 2009–2014
People from Castro Urdiales
Spanish Socialist Workers' Party MEPs